Director of Intelligence may refer to:

 head of the Directorate of Intelligence (United Kingdom)
 Director of Military Intelligence (Ireland)
 Director of the Central Intelligence Agency
 Director of National Intelligence